Amblyseius fijiensis is a species of mite in the family Phytoseiidae.

References

fijiensis
Articles created by Qbugbot
Animals described in 1984